was a town located in Hoi District, east-central Aichi Prefecture, Japan.

As of January 1, 2006, the town had an estimated population of 16,440 and a population density of 449 persons per km². Its total area was 36.61 km².

The town was often called as Mikawaichinomiya to avoid confusion with the much larger city of Ichinomiya in former Owari Province.

History

Ichinomiya was named after the Ichinomiya of Mikawa Province, the Toga Shrine.

Formation and mergers
 On July 1, 1906 - Modern Ichinomiya village was created through the merger of two small hamlets.
 In 1954 - Ichinomiya annexed the village of Yamato (from neighboring Yana District).
 On April 1, 1961 - The village of Ichinomiya was elevated to town status to become the town of Ichinomiya.
 On February 1, 2006 - Ichinomiya was merged into the expanded city of Toyokawa and has ceased to exist as an independent municipality.

External links
Toyokawa official website 

Dissolved municipalities of Aichi Prefecture
Toyokawa, Aichi